Melaleuceae is a tribe in the plant family Myrtaceae from south-east Asia and Oceania, with a main center of diversity in Australia.

Genera
Melaleuca (including Callistemon)
Calothamnus
Lamarchea
Conothamnus
Beaufortia
Regelia
Phymatocarpus
Eremaea

References

Rosid tribes
Myrtaceae